Coleophora flavovena is a moth of the family Coleophoridae. It is found in Japan (the islands of Hokkaido and Honshu) and in Korea.

Adults are on wing from late June to early August.

The larvae feed on the leaves of Artemisia princeps and Artemisia montana. They create a leaf-case, made of leaf fragment which are cut from the edges of the leaves of the host plant and attached (one behind the other) in a zigzag manner. The colour is generally dark greyish-brown, except for some sections which are densely covered by light-coloured felt.

References

flavovena
Moths described in 1931
Moths of Japan
Moths of Korea